Sophie Katarina Morris (born 7 June 1993) is a New Zealand singer, actor and presenter who performs within New Zealand and internationally. She was the first ever female to tour with The Ten Tenors, joining the group on their 'Wish You Were Here' Tour in 2018.

Early life 
Morris was born and raised in Dunedin. She began singing aged 10 as Gretl in The Sound of Music which sparked a love for being on the stage. She attended St Hilda's Collegiate School where she was Arts Prefect. She went on to train in classical and contemporary voice at the University of Otago, gaining a Master's in music, as well as a Bachelor of Commerce in marketing.

Career 
Morris performs as a singer, actor and presenter.

Musical theatre roles performed include Jellylorum in Cats, Rapunzel in Into the Woods, Sophie in Mamma Mia and Sandy in Grease.

New Zealand events performed at include Coca-Cola Christmas in the Park, the APRA Awards and Cruise for a Cause on Milford Sound.

She has performed sell-out nights of her own shows Sophie Goes to Broadway and Sophie Morris on Stage. She released her debut album Sophie Morris – Songs from the Stage in 2018.

Morris performed Christmas carols for passengers on an Air New Zealand flight on Christmas Day in 2015 when returning to Dunedin to see her family.

Morris presents as a newsreader, host, guest lecturer, guest speaker and narrator. She is a regular newsreader on Channel 39 and is often invited to speak about her career, the performance industry and provide advice and motivation.

During the COVID-19 pandemic in New Zealand, Morris created a show "Sophie Morris – Songs and Stories from the Stage" which was broadcast in a live stream from her living room. The show shared stories and music from her adventures as a performer. Proceeds of the performance went to Pet Refuge, a New Zealand charity.

National anthems 
Morris has performed for many sporting events including the T20 Black Clash (with past and present members of the All Blacks and Black Caps), the Joseph Parker v Andy Ruiz WBO World Heavyweight Championship Title Fight, The Oceania Cup (Great Britain Rugby League Lions v Kiwis) and the Rugby League Four Nations.

During the COVID-19 lockdown in New Zealand, Morris performed the Australian and New Zealand national anthems for television broadcast on ANZAC Day for viewers to sing along with at home in an ANZAC Day Tribute.

References

External links 
 Official website

1993 births
Living people
People educated at St Hilda's Collegiate School
University of Otago alumni
Musicians from Dunedin
21st-century New Zealand  women  singers
Mass media people from Dunedin